Bardas Phokas (c. 878 – c. 968) was a notable Byzantine general in the first half of the 10th century. He was the father of Byzantine emperor Nikephoros II Phokas and the kouropalates Leo Phokas the Younger.

Bardas was the scion of the Phokas family, one of the great houses of military aristocracy, his father was Nikephoros Phokas the Elder, an eminent Byzantine general with a distinguished record of service in Italy. In 917, he participated under the orders of his elder brother Leo in the disastrous Battle of Acheloos.

In 941, he was governor of the Theme of Armeniakon, in the area previously known as Paphlagonia. In this year the Rus' navy under the leadership of Igor I of Kiev attacked the Empire. Driven off from Constantinople, the Rus' landed in Bithynia and ravaged it. Bardas kept the attackers from doing too much damage with his local militia levies until the larger Byzantine army under John Kourkouas came and drove the Rus' out.

In 945 he was appointed supreme commander of the Byzantine armies of the East by Emperor Constantine VII Porphyrogenitus. In this command he did not make much progress against the Arab forces, being repeatedly defeated by Sayf al-Daula, emir of Aleppo. In 953, he was defeated and severely wounded by Sayf and after further defeats, he was replaced by his son Nikephoros in 954/955.

When Nikephoros came to the throne he made his father Caesar, only a step below the imperial title. He died about 968 at the age of 90.

References

Norwich, John Julius. Byzantium: The Apogee. (New York: Alfred A Knopf, 1992)

870s births
960s deaths
9th-century Byzantine people
10th-century Byzantine people
Year of birth uncertain
Year of death uncertain
Bardas 01
Caesars (Byzantine nobles)
Byzantine generals
Byzantine people of the Arab–Byzantine wars
Domestics of the Schools
Governors of the Armeniac Theme